Epacternis alluaudalis is a species of snout moth in the genus Epacternis. It was described by Patrice J.A. Leraut in 2011 and is known from Kenya.

References

Moths described in 2011
Pyralinae